Johannes K.E. Faust (12 February  1832, Stettin - 18 January -1903, Pirna) was a German entomologist.

Faust specialised in Coleoptera, especially Curculionidae. Faust’s beetle collection, including many types  is now conserved mostly in the Museum für Tierkunde  in Dresden, Germany (SMTD) and the Museum National d'Histoire Naturelle  in Paris, France (MNHN).

He was a Member of  the Entomological Society of Stettin.

Works
Partial list
1877. Beiträge zur Kenntniss der Käfer des Europäischen und Asiatischen Russlands mit Einschluss der Küsten des Kaspischen Meers. Horae Societatis Entomologicae Rossicae varii sermonibus in Rossia usitatis editae 12: 300-330.
1882 Rüsselkäfer aus dem Amurgebiet Deutsche Entomol. Zeitschr. 26 (2), 17–295
1893 Neue Ost-Sibirische Curculioniden  Deutsche Entomol. Zeitschr. 2, 201–205
1894 Viaggio di Leonardo Fea in Birmania e regioni vicine. LX. Curculionidae. Annali del’Museo Civico di storia Naturale di Genova. 34: 153-370
Reise von E. Simon in Venezuela. Curculionidae. Pars secunda. Stett. Entomol. Ztg., 1893 (1894), 54:313-367.
1899. Viaggo di Lamberto Loria nella Papuasia orientale. XXIII. Curculionidae. Annali del Museo Civico di Storia Naturale di Genova 40: 1–130.

References
1903 Nekrolog für Johannes Faust (mit Portrait) Deutsche Entomologische Zeitschrift Jahrgang 1903: 401-405
 Obit. 1903 Wiener Entomologische Zeitung 22: 36
Anthony Musgrave (1932). Bibliography of Australian Entomology, 1775-1930, with biographical notes on authors and collectors Royal Zoological Society of New South Wales (Sydney) : viii + 380.

German entomologists
Coleopterists
1832 births
1903 deaths